The High School of Art and Design is a career and technical education high school in Manhattan, New York City, New York State, United States. Founded in 1936 as the School of Industrial Art, the school moved to 1075 Second Avenue in 1960 and more recently, its Midtown Manhattan location on 56th Street, between Second and Third Avenues, in September 2012. High School of Art and Design is operated by the New York City Department of Education.

History
On November 2, 1936, four art teachers began what was to become the High School of Art and Design, the School of Industrial Art, in a former Manhattan elementary school at 257 West 40th Street, which for a time had housed a WPA Federal Theatre Project locale. Initially, they used orange crates and plywood to make storage and desks. One of the co-founders, John B. Kenny, became principal in 1941. The school soon moved to 211 East 79th Street on the Upper East Side, the site of the former annex to Benjamin Franklin High School. In September 1960, the School of Industrial Art changed its name to the High School of Art and Design and moved to 1075 Second Avenue in east Midtown.

The 1936 school was first envisioned as a continuation school, that is, a school where children who had left school and gotten jobs attended for half days to continue their education, normally including vocational classes relevant to their current or possible future jobs. However, it opened as a vocational high school,

On November 8, 2004, a rally was scheduled on the occasion of the school's 68th anniversary. This was to include a press conference at which increased support of the school would be urged. On November 8, 2006, the school celebrated its 70th anniversary. The office of the Mayor of New York City issued a proclamation making November 8 "High School of Art and Design Day".

Academics and events
Applicants must take an entrance exam and present a portfolio to be accepted. Freshmen sample all art and design subjects before selecting a major for their sophomore, junior and senior years. Students at Art and Design receive two periods of art instruction per day, choosing from among eight art majors: cartooning, animation, architecture, graphic design, illustration, fashion, photography, and film/video.

Art and Design's Kenny Gallery, named for the school's founding principal, John B. Kenny, hosts monthly art exhibits of student work. The gallery is open to the public. The Black Box Theatre was donated by the Friends of Art and Design (FAD).

Notable people

Faculty
Some members of the school's faculty became notable for their creative work outside teaching. These include:
Daisy Aldan, (1923-2001), poet, actress, editor and translator
Irv Docktor, fine artist and book illustrator
Frank Eliscu, designer and sculptor of the Heisman Memorial Trophy and other works of art
Alvin Hollingsworth, comic book illustrator and fine artist
Bel Kaufman, author of Up the Down Staircase
Bernard Krigstein, painter, illustrator, cartoonist
Tom Wesselmann, pop artist, famous for his "Great American Nude" series

Alumni

 1937: Paul Winchell, ventriloquist, inventor, actor
 1940: Violet Barclay, a pioneering female comic book artist
 1940: Al Plastino, comic book illustrator, writer and editor
 1940: Chic Stone, comic book illustrator
 1941: Allen Bellman, comic book artist
 1943: Carmine Infantino, comic book artist, editor, member Comic Book Hall of Fame
 1943: Helmut Krone, art director
 1943: Henry Wolf, graphic designer, art director and photographer
 1944: Joe Orlando, comic book illustrator, Mad magazine associate publisher
 1945: Tony Bennett, singer and painter
 1945: Joe Giella, comic book illustrator
 1945: Everett Raymond Kinstler, portrait artist
 1946: Sy Barry, comic book illustrator
 1946: Vladimir Kagan, furniture designer
 1946: Al Scaduto, syndicated cartoonist
 1947: Alex Toth, comic book illustrator, animator for Hanna-Barbera
 1947: John Romita Sr., comic book illustrator
 1949: Howard Beckerman, animator and author
 1950: Dick Giordano, comic book illustrator
 1950: Jules Maidoff, artist and founder of SACI (Studio Arts College International) in Florence, Italy
 1951: Leo Dillon, adult and children's book illustrator
 1951: Bill Kresse, syndicated cartoonist
 1952: Eva Hesse, minimalist painter and sculptor
 1952: Sam Scali, advertising-agency owner
 1953: Peter Hujar, photographer
 1953: Ronald Wayne, Apple Computer co-founder
 1955: I. C. Rapoport, photojournalist
 1956: Ralph Bakshi, animator, filmmaker
 1956: John Johnson, TV news anchor, author and painter
 1956: Barbara Nessim, illustrator and educator
 1956: Regina Porter, fashion designer
 1957: Bobby Weinstein, songwriter, member of the Songwriters Hall of Fame
 1957: Phoebe Gilman, children's book author and illustrator
 1959: Neal Adams, comic book illustrator
 1959: Paul J. Pugliese, Time magazine cartographer
 1960: Calvin Klein, fashion designer
 1960: George Kuchar, cult filmmaker and director
 1960: Antonio Lopez, fashion illustrator
 1960: Gerard Malanga, poet, photographer and filmmaker
 1960: William T. Williams, abstract painter
 1961: Robert Volpe, painter and NYPD detective, the "Art Cop"
 1962: Roscoe Orman, actor, author and artist, best known as "Gordon" on Sesame Street
 1962: Simon Gaon, painter
 1963: Ronnie Landfield, abstract painter
 1963: Joey Skaggs, media prankster, performance artist
 1963: Jim Simon, animator and artist
 1963: Michael Steiner, abstract artist and sculptor 
 1965: Jackie Curtis, Warhol film star, poet, playwright
 1965: Art Spiegelman, Pulitzer Prize winning author and cartoonist
 1967: Bert Monroy, digital art pioneer, author of books on Photoshop, Illustrator
 1967: Eric Carr (Paul Charles Caravello), drummer in the rock band Kiss
 1967: Frank Brunner, comic book illustrator
 1967: Larry Hama, writer and comic book illustrator
 1967: Ralph Reese, comic book illustrator
 1967: Lenny White, jazz-funk drummer, member of Return to Forever
 1967: Terry Winters, abstract painter and printmaker
 1968: Candida Royalle, producer and director of couples-oriented erotic films
 1968: John Steptoe, author and illustrator of children's books
 1968: Robin Tewes, artist and painter
 1968: Frank Verlizzo ("Fraver"), Drama Desk Award-winning designer of theater art
 1969: Pat Cleveland, fashion model
 1969: Harvey Fierstein, actor, playwright, gay activist
 1970: Amy Heckerling, film director, writer, actress
 1971: Lawrence Hilton-Jacobs, actor and singer
 1971: Alan Kupperberg, cartoonist and illustrator
 1971: Steven Meisel, fashion photographer
 1971: Lynette Washington, jazz vocalist
 1973: Lisa Jane Persky, actress.
 1973: Tom Sito, animator, filmmaker, educator
 1974: Manny Vega, painter, muralist, mosaicist
 1976: Marcelino Sanchez, film and television actor
 1976: Tracy 168 (Michael Tracey), graffiti artist 
 1976: Mike Carlin, comic book writer and editor
 1977: Joe Jusko, comic book illustrator
 1977: Gladys Portugues, champion body builder
 1978: Lasana M. Sekou, poet, journalist, author, publisher
 1978: Lorna Simpson, artist and photographer
 1978: Lee Quiñones, actor and graffiti artist 
 1978: Margaret Matz, architect and illustrator 
 1978: Malcolm Jones III, comic book illustrator
 1979: Denys Cowan, comic book illustrator
 1979: Jimmy Palmiotti, inker and writer of comic books, games and film
 1979: Mark Texeira, comic book illustrator
 1980: Chris 'Daze' Ellis, graffiti writer and artist
 1980: Nicole Willis, musician, artist
 1981: Marc Jacobs, fashion designer
 1982: Lady Pink (Sandra Fabara), graffiti writer, artist and muralist.
 1983: Mare139 (Carlos Rodriguez), graffiti artist and designer
 1985: Roger Sanchez, Grammy Award-winning DJ, producer, recording artist
 1985: Christopher Martin, rapper
 1986: Pharoahe Monch (Troy Donald Jamerson), hip hop artist
 1987: Ivan de Prume, former drummer in the groove metal band White Zombie
 1990: Kwamé (Kwamé Holland), rapper and music producer
 1990: Jamal Igle, comic book and animation storyboard artist
 1992: Joe Madureira, comic book illustrator
 1992: Mobb Deep, hip-hop duo
 1995: Cool Calm Pete (Peter Chung), hip hop artist as a member of Babbletron and then as a Solo artist
 1998: Fabolous, rapper
 2006: ASAP Ferg (Darold D. Brown Ferguson Jr.), rapper and fashion designer
 2007: LaQuan Smith, fashion designer
 2014: Devon Rodriguez, artist and painter

References

External links

 
NYC Department of Education: Art and Design High School
High School of Art and Design Alumni Association
Friends of Art and Design High School

1936 establishments in New York City
Art schools in New York City
Culture of New York City
Educational institutions established in 1936
Public high schools in Manhattan
Midtown Manhattan